Health Oriented Preventive Education (HOPE) is a Pakistan NGO which provides the poor with service in the sectors of health and education, particularly focusing on women and children. Founded in July 1997, it is mainly based in Karachi, the largest city in Pakistan, and its vicinity, but is working nationwide through its offices.

For the health care services, HOPE runs several medical centers, providing primary health care services for those who cannot afford private hospitals. Some other services are also involved: nutrition support for malnourished mothers and children, distribution of water-purifying agent for the access to safe water, ante-natal care for reducing maternal mortality rate, etc.

For better education of children, which is often disregarded in today’s Pakistan, HOPE founded three formal schools (Karachi Zia Colony School, Muzaffargarh School and Thatta School) and almost 200 home schools. Home schools, in specific, are fighting illiteracy, and this effort ends up in helping both uneducated and educated girls in the community. Teenage girls who gave up learning are taught by more educated girls. In this way young girls are provided with education, while older girls are provided with stable jobs for their living. In the situation that many students drop out of school because of the expensive education cost, HOPE schools seek to give them another opportunity of education. For example, literacy classes for adults and vocational training such as sewing, embroidery, computer, and English courses are also provided.

HOPE also arranges emergency relief in the case of floods or earthquake. For example, when the 2008 Ziarat earthquake (a doublet earthquake) occurred, several relief operations were conducted by HOPE team consisted of doctors, paramedics, and social workers. HOPE provided food, proof tents, and clothes as well as medical care, and more than 6000 people were stood to benefit.

All these projects of HOPE are under the motto of ‘self-sufficiency’ and ‘sustainability’, which means that the goal of HOPE is to help the community reach sustainable development by achieving self-sufficiency. They try this by largely working in cooperation with Community Based Organizations (CBO’S) CBO’S are often considered more effective in meeting the community’s need and better implementation, which gives more reasons for HOPE to work with CBO’S.

External links 
Official website

Medical and health organisations based in Pakistan
Organisations based in Karachi
Child-related organisations in Pakistan
Educational organisations based in Pakistan
Non-profit organisations based in Pakistan
Charities based in Pakistan